Underground pneumatic piercing tools are often referred to as a hog, air hog, or pneuma gopher.  The tool is used to bore a hole underground between two points without disturbing the surface ground.  This open-air chamber is referred to as the borehole and is used to either run ducting for the product or the raw product itself between the two points.

Uses
The tool is used in the installation of all public utilities electricity, gas, phone, and cable television; these are referred to as products.  It is also used to install residential lawn irrigation systems and auxiliary home power lines. The tool is utilized in instances when it is difficult or cost-prohibitive to plow or trench the product into the ground.  Some of these instances are under driveways, roads, sidewalks, and landscaping.  Pneumatic piercing tools are a lower-cost alternative to directional boring.

How it works
The tool uses air to pound its way through the ground underneath the obstruction. The tool is cylindrical and ranges from one to eight inches in diameter and between three and six feet long.  It is made from metal.  Different manufacturers have different font styles and control mechanisms.  Some have bullet-shaped fronts and others have stepped fronts similar to a unit. Compressed air is used to power the tool, this air is run through a hydraulic hose with an oiler attachment to send oil through with the compressed air. The tool works in a way very similar to a jackhammer, inside the cylinder is a piston a valve opens and the air blows into the chamber forcing the piston forward which in turn propels the tool forward. The valve then shuts and the piston is pushed at a slower speed back into the tool, the valve reopens the piston pounds again and the tool moves forward. This process is continually repeated until the bore has run the intended distance.  Both the lighter reverse hit of the piston and the friction of the ground surrounding the tool keep it moving forward instead of stopping. The speed of the tool can be controlled by a valve that connects the tool's hose to the air supply this valve is outside the tool and remains accessible to the operator. As the tool pounds through the ground, it compresses the soil. This compaction maintains the same diameter as the tool and leaves the borehole through which the product is passed.

Performing a bore
The purpose of the bore is to get from point A to point B under the obstruction. First, the operator surveys the area and the obstacle (road, sidewalk, driveway). Utility locates must be present for any underground work, the path most clear of utilities is chosen to send the tool through. The first hole is now dug on one side of the obstacle.  This hole must be large enough to fit the tool and the operator in it so they can aim the tool. The hole also must be deep enough that as the tool compacts the ground the surface remains undisturbed. The depth of the starting bore pit depends on the type of soil that is being worked in and how well it compacts. The operator aims the tool to the desired exit point and allows it to perform its function creating a borehole under the ground without disturbing the surface. The tool is tracked by the operator who feels the tool pounding and can approximate the tool's location under the ground. The operator also monitors the surface to make sure that it is undisturbed. As the tool nears the exit point it is slowed down and an exit pit is dug to locate both the tool and the bore. As the tool enters the exit pit the operator chooses to either dig up the tool to retrieve it or reverse the tool back into the first bore pit to retrieve it. Now between the two pits is a completed bore under the obstacle which can be used to run the product.

Drawbacks
Pneumatic bore tools do have drawbacks which can cause difficulties completing the bore.  First, the distance of the bore the tool can create is limited by the length of the hose that supplies the tool with air.  Also, the tool is not steerable. Once it has exited the bore pit, the operator no longer has control over it. The tool can be deflected by rocks and soil density to a path the operator had not intended.  If this deflection is in the direction of the surface, the tool can cause damage to the obstacle being bored. If it is downward, the tool can dive to an unrecoverable depth.  If it is deflected side to side the tool could also run into other utilities.  These hazards make it important for the operator to maintain close observation of the tool. The type of ground the tool is working in can also lead to problems. If the soil is too loose, the tool cannot compact the soil, stalling it out or leaving no borehole. If the soil is rocky the tool may be deflected or fail to pound forward due to its inability to break the rock. These drawbacks can be overcome by directional boring or straight-line horizontal underground boring machines that use either wet (slick boring, slurry boring) or dry (auger boring, jack and bore) methods.

See also
 Ditch Witch
 Vermeer Company

Pneumatic tools